USS O'Brien (DD-975) was a  built by the Ingalls Shipbuilding Division of Litton Industries at Pascagoula, Mississippi. It was named for Captain Jeremiah O'Brien and his five brothers: Gideon, John, William, Dennis and Joseph. The O'Briens were crew members on board the sloop Unity, which captured HMS Margaretta at the entrance to Machias harbor on 12 June 1775. O’Brien was decommissioned on 24 September 2004, and was later sunk as part of a training exercise in 2006.

History 
The destroyer has completed seven major deployments to the Western Pacific/Indian Oceans and seven deployments to the Persian Gulf.

During her third deployment (13 January 1984 – 1 August 1984), which included 81 consecutive days at sea in the Indian Ocean, O'Brien took part in two refugee rescue missions, earning the Humanitarian Service Medal.

O'Briens fourth western pacific deployment (January 1986 – June 1986) took the destroyer further north. Operations included joint U.S./Korean naval exercises TEAM SPIRIT 86 and TAE KWAN DO 86-1. Ports visited: Subic Bay and Manila, Philippines; Okinawa, Sasebo and Yokosuka, Japan; Pohang and Pusan, Korea; Hong Kong

Following the installation of an advanced towed array sonar system in 1987, O'Brien conducted experimental sonar evaluation operations in the Northern Pacific and Bering Sea.

During her fifth deployment, O'Brien became part of the Middle East Force. O'Brien participated in Operation Earnest Will, escorting reflagged Kuwaiti tankers, and Operation Praying Mantis, during which O'Brien was a key member of the three-ship surface action group that engaged and sank the Iranian guided missile frigate .

O'Brien underwent an extensive overhaul and received major weapon systems improvements in 1988 including the Mk 41 Vertical Launch System (VLS) for the Tomahawk cruise missile, the SQR-1 tactical towed array sonar system and the LAMPS MK III helicopter system.

While assigned to the Middle East Force from September to December 1990, O'Brien participated in Operation Desert Shield. Conducting Persian Gulf patrols in support of the United Nations embargo of Iraq, O'Brien investigated over four hundred vessels.

In December 1991 and again from February to April 1992, O'Brien conducted counter narcotic operations off the coasts of Central and South America.

In August 1992, O'Brien departed San Diego to become a member of the Forward Deployed Naval Forces. En route from San Diego to Yokosuka, O'Brien conducted follow-on testing and evaluation of the vertically launched anti-submarine rocket and the SQQ-89 sonar system on the Pacific Missile Test Range off Kauai, Hawaii. O'Brien arrived in Yokosuka, Japan, in October 1992.

In June 1993, O'Brien departed Yokosuka for her third deployment to the Middle East Force where she conducted Persian Gulf patrols in support of Operation Southern Watch and surveillance operations in the Gulf of Oman.

O'Brien participated in several joint exercises with the U.S. Marines and Air Force, as well as combined exercises with the Armed Forces of Singapore, Brunei, and the Republic of Korea. O'Brien departed on her fourth Middle East Force deployment on 17 February 1995 and continued to conduct operations in support of the United Nations embargo on Iraq.

O'Briens operational tempo remained very high throughout 1996, including her fifth Middle East Force Deployment, participating in the large naval exercise RIMPAC '96 as well as a member of the Taiwan contingency force. During Pacific Middle East Force (PACMEF), O'Brien continued conducting operations in support of the United Nations embargo on Iraq and her efforts resulted in the seizure of over 1.5 million gallons of contraband oil.

O'Brien was away from homeport for 233 days in 1996, but was awarded with the Battle E Device, Meritorious Unit Commendation, Humanitarian Service Award and the nominated for the prestigious Spokane Trophy.

In 1999, O'Brien participated in exercises with the Philippine Navy and in CROCEX '99 with the Royal Australian Navy.

2000 was yet another high tempo year with 188 days spent underway. O'Brien participated in Counter Special Operations Forces Exercise (CSOFEX) in Korea, COBRA Gold 2000, East Timor operations and completed an entire tactical training cycle in a record 19 days.

All of the previous years' hard work paid off in 2001 when O'Brien participated in PACMEF '01, conducting maritime interdiction operations, including boarding over thirty merchant vessels throughout the summer in the Persian Gulf. On 11 September, O'Brien emergency sortied from Bahrain to the Arabian Sea. She participated in the opening Tomahawk cruise missile strikes into Afghanistan in support of Operation Enduring Freedom.

Sinking 

Ship's crest 
O'Briens official crest, as exhibited, symbolizes the rich tradition of courage and determination initiated by Jeremiah O'Brien, and continued by those ships that bore his name.

The golden pile and its associated elements are resplendent in symbolism. The pile, in conjunction with the way bars, represents a ship at sea and is symbolic of the grand tradition of the U.S. Navy. Taken by itself, the pile also represents the Roman numeral "V", equaling the total number of ships, including DD-975, to be honored with the name of O'Brien. The shamrock centered at the top of the pile alludes to Jeremiah O'Brien's Irish ancestry and, in addition, to the arms of the previous .

The crossed nautical tridents overlapped by the single cannon dedicate the first naval battle of the American Revolution in which Jeremiah O’Brien and his men defeated the British warship, Margaretta. O'Brien and his men, armed with only limited muskets, axes, and pitchforks (represented by the crossed tridents) boarded Margaretta and defeated an enemy armed with superior guns and training.

Pine trees on either side of the cannon symbolize the state of Maine, the home of Jeremiah O'Brien and the site of his famed victory. Reflected in the ship's motto, "Loyalty, Unity, Freedom", are the qualities of Captain O'Brien's contribution to the American Revolution. The motto also displays the guile of a long line of U.S. Navy sailors on ships named O'Brien.

Gallery

See also 
List of destroyers of the United States Navy

References

External links 

 
 navsource.org: USS O'Brien
 united-states-navy.com: USS O'Brien
 USS O'BrienCrew pictures

Spruance-class destroyers
Cold War destroyers of the United States
Gulf War ships of the United States
1976 ships
Ships sunk as targets